The Older Ones is the first compilation album by Norwegian blackened death metal band Old Funeral, which was made up by key players in the Norwegian black metal scene, including bassist/vocalist Olve "Abbath" Eikemo (Immortal), guitarist Harald "Demonaz" Nævdal (Immortal) and guitarist Kristian "Varg" Vikernes (Burzum). By the time this album was released, the members had already gone their separate ways, with Varg in jail and Immortal a growing concern for Abbath.

Track listing
"Abduction of Limbs" – 4:14
"Annoying Individual" – 2:54
"Skin and Bone" – 3:51
"Haunted" – 3:33
"Incantation" – 4:51
"Devoured Carcass" – 3:31
"Forced to be Lost" – 4:16
"Alone Walking" – 6:50
"Lyktemenn" – 3:09
"Into Hades" – 2:26
"My Tyrant Grace" – 5:12
"Devoured Carcass" (recorded live at Hulen, 30 September 1991) – 3:29

Personnel
Olve "Abbath" Eikemo – bass (tracks 1–3), vocals (tracks 1–3)
Thorlak – bass (tracks 4–12)
Kristian "Varg" Vikernes – guitars (tracks 4, 5, 6, 7 and 12)
Tore Bratseth – guitars (tracks 4–12)
Jørn Inge Tunsberg – guitars (tracks 8–11)
Padden – drums (all tracks)

References

1999 compilation albums
Old Funeral albums
Black metal compilation albums
Death metal compilation albums
Hammerheart Records albums